Hydrangenol is a dihydroisocoumarin. It can be found in Hydrangea macrophylla, as well as its 8-O-glucoside. (−)-Hydrangenol 4′-O-glucoside and (+)-hydrangenol 4′-O-glucoside can be found in Hydrangeae Dulcis Folium, the processed leaves of H. macrophylla var. thunbergii.

References 

Dihydroisocoumarins